
Year 296 BC was a year of the pre-Julian Roman calendar. At the time it was known as the Year of the Consulship of Violens and Caecus (or, less frequently, year 458 Ab urbe condita). The denomination 296 BC for this year has been used since the early medieval period, when the Anno Domini calendar era became the prevalent method in Europe for naming years.

Events
By place
Roman Republic
 Third Samnite War:
 The consul Lucius Volumnius Flamma Violens and the proconsuls Quintus Fabius Maximus Rullianus and Publius Decius Mus devastate the lands of Samnium.
 The Samnite noble Gellius Egnatius leads an army into Umbria and makes an alliance with the majority of the Etruscan city-states and some of the Umbrian cities.
 Following the departure of Gellius, the Romans in Samnium attack walled positions. Volumnius captures three forts, Decius captures the town of Murgantia, and Fabius captures the city of Romulea and the town of Ferentinum.
 The Samnite-Etruscan coalition campaigns against the consul Appius Claudius Caecus in Etruria and inflicts several defeats on the Romans.
 Volumnius orders Fabius to march into Lucania, where he stamps out pro-Samnite disturbances against the ruling class.
 Volumnius joins Appius in Etruria and they defeat the Samnite-Etruscan coalition in a battle, killing 6900 and capturing 2120.
 Volumnius launches a surprise attack against a Samnite column that had been raiding Campania. He frees 7400 Campanian prisoners, kills 6000 Samnites, and captures 2500 Samnites, including the general Statius Minacius and four military tribunes.
 Gellius has a powerful warband of Semnones reinforce the anti-Roman coalition, which is also joined by yet more cities of the Umbrians.
 The temple to Bellona is erected at the south end of the prata Flaminia, later the Circus Flaminius, in Rome.

Greece
 Ptolemy makes peace with Demetrius Poliorcetes, to whom he betrothes his daughter Ptolemais.

Births

Deaths

References